Xu Aimin (born January 1957) is a former Chinese politician who served as Vice-Chairman of Jiangxi Provincial People's Political Consultative Conference since 2013. In 2014, Xu was placed under investigation by the Communist Party of China's anti-graft agency.

Career
Xu Aimin was born in Lichuan County, Jiangxi in January 1957. He graduated from Jingdezhen Ceramic Institute. Xu became the Mayor of Linchuan in 1988 and Deputy Mayor of Jingdezhen in 1997. He took the Mayor of Jingdezhen position in 2001. In 2011, Xu became the director of Jiangxi Development and Reform Commission. In 2013, Xu served as Vice-Chairman of Jiangxi Provincial People's Political Consultative Conference.

In 2014, Xu was placed under investigation by the Communist Party of China's anti-graft agency. On February 17, 2015, Xu was expelled from the party and demoted to deputy division-level.

References

1957 births
Politicians from Fuzhou, Jiangxi
Living people
Political office-holders in Jiangxi
Chinese Communist Party politicians from Jiangxi
People's Republic of China politicians from Jiangxi
Expelled members of the Chinese Communist Party
Delegates to the 10th National People's Congress